Menominee County is the name of two counties in the United States:

 Menominee County, Michigan 
 Menominee County, Wisconsin